Allington is a village and civil parish in the South Kesteven district of Lincolnshire, England,  north-west of Grantham. The 2001 census gave a parish population of 728 in 329 households. The population increased to 897 in 422 households in the 2011 census.

History
Some evidence has been found of settlement in the Neolithic period. Roman artefacts have also been found nearby. The population at the time of the Domesday Book was about 300.

At the time of the Norman conquest the name of the village was Adelinctune. It belonged to the historical wapentake of Winnibriggs and Threo.

Allington's Grade II listed Anglican parish church is dedicated to the Holy Trinity. East and West Allington parishes were combined in 1896 and St James's Church in East Allington, the smaller building of the two, was demolished.

The poet George Crabbe (1754–1832) became the incumbent of Muston, Leicestershire and West Allington in 1789, remaining until 1792. His Natural History of the Vale of Belvoir was a pioneering study of the district. English Heritage gives the date of Crabbe's Allington incumbency as 1790 to 1814, but he was an absentee for most of the remaining years.

In the 19th century Allington comprised two parishes, East and West, but centred on one village as a township which looked after the poor of both parishes. In 1872 White's Directory reported that East Allington had a population of 267, and West Allington 141. Noted was the "farm house... in Elizabethan style" [on Bottesford Road] "said to be the ancient manor house". The village cross is mentioned, as is a "copious" chalybeate spring called 'Saltwell' at the south. The ecclesiastical parish of Holy Trinity Church in West Allington was a rectory in the gift of the Lord Chancellor; the incumbent, in lieu of tithes, received  of glebe – an area of land used to support a parish priest – and a rectory house built in 1870 for £1,250. The parish of East Allington, under St James Church (restored in 1855), received a benefice which was combined with that of Sedgebrook, and included  of glebe. The feast day for both Allington parishes was on Old Michaelmas Day. A National School had been built in 1848 by the lord of the manor, and in 1858 a Primitive Methodist chapel was built for £250. Professions and trades listed in 1872 for West Allingon were the parish rector, a tailor, two joiners & undertakers, and four farmers, two of whom were also graziers. Listed for East Allington were a schoolmistress, a shopkeeper, a mason who was also a bricklayer and contractor, a brewer, the licensed victualler of the Welby Arms who was also a farmer and grazier, and five further farmers, one of whom was also a coal & lime merchant, two a grazier, and another a grazier and butcher.

The Welby family was associated with the village from the 18th century onwards.

During the Second World War, Allington Hall becoming a military hospital. A prisoner-of-war camp in the village held German and later Italian inmates. The estate was subsequently dispersed in 1947.

Amenities

Holy Trinity Anglican Church belongs to the Saxonwell Group of Churches. It is one of four churches in the group, the others being at Long Bennington, Foston and Sedgebrook.

Allington with Sedgebrook Church of England Primary School is in Marston Lane, Allington. The first school in the village was established on the village green in 1847. The school was moved to its present site in 1906. It was extended in 2003–04.

The village contains the Welby Arms public house, The Old Manor House hotel, a building dating to about 1660, a doctors' surgery, and a 1929-built village hall.

The playing field at Allington is a sports facility owned by the parish council. The Viking Way, Sewstern Lane, passed through the village until 1997, but was diverted to follow a road bridge over the A1.

Local community activities include morris dancing, gardening, a preschool and a women's institute.

There are CallConnect bus services to Grantham. The nearest railway stations are at Bottesford  to the west, and Grantham  to the south-east.

References

External links

"Allington Parish Council", Lincolnshire.gov.uk. Retrieved 1 July 3013
"Community Web Site"

Villages in Lincolnshire
Civil parishes in Lincolnshire
South Kesteven District